"Airplane Pt. 2" is a song recorded by South Korean boy group BTS, released as a B track on the album Love Yourself: Tear. On November 7, 2018, the Japanese version of the song was released through Def Jam as their ninth Japanese single.

Background and release
It was confirmed by Big Hit Entertainment once the tracklist for Love Yourself: Tear was released that "Airplane Pt. 2" is a follow up to the song "Airplane" which was off J-Hope's mixtape Hope World. In a behind the scene's album review member RM said that when CEO Bang Si-hyuk first heard J-Hope's song it sounded like a BTS song, inspiring them to write a part two.

Promotion
BTS promoted the Korean version of the song on various music programs in South Korea including Music Bank, Show! Music Core, Inkigayo, and M Countdown. The Korean version was also promoted live on The Ellen DeGeneres Show on May 25, although it was only released online.

On December 1, 2018, BTS performed the song at the 2018 Melon Music Awards in Seoul and in the same month they performed it at the 2018 Mnet Asian Music Awards in Hong Kong.

Reception 
Overall, the reception for the song was positive. Per Pearl Shin at thirdcoastreview, "Airplane Pt. 2" has an addictive hook that is perfect for the summer months. The popular Korean album reviewer IZM called it trendy and full of Latin rhythm while Elias Leight of Rolling Stone said "Airplane Pt. 2" rejuvenated the swanky strut of 50 Cent’s “P.I.M.P.”.

In the review for Pitchfork, Sheldon Pearce claimed that the song "reads like an analog for being a pop-star".
 MTV'''s Crystal Bell echoed these sentiments additionally characterizing the song as "catchy and current, a dreamy analog for the pop-star life" and praising "But to watch BTS perform the song live is to watch seven idols in full command of their artistry, where every subtle movement is part of a larger story".

Writing for The Guardian Alexis Petridis was a bit ambiguous about his review stating it sounded like a regular British pop song, with all the good and bad that entailed.

Upon release the Korean version of the song sold more than 10,000 copies in the United States.

 Accolades 

CompositionAirplane pt 2 is in the key of C minor. It is 140 beats per minute and 3:30 minutes long. It is a Latin-pop inspired song with lyrics that talks about how far they've come, from wishing to succeed to being able to travel around the world singing their music.

Ali Tamposi, who co-wrote "Havana" by Camila Cabello, stated she wanted "Airplane pt. 2" to have a similar feel to "Havana".

Credits and personnel
Korean version
The original credits are adapted from the CD liner notes of Love Yourself: Tear''.

Pdogg – producer, keyboard, synthesizer, vocal and rap arrangement, digital editing, recording engineer
RM – producer
Ali Tamposi – producer
Liza Owen – producer
Roman Campolo – producer
"hitman" bang – producer, keyboard
Suga – producer
J-Hope – producer
Jungkook – chorus
ADORA – chorus, recording engineer
Lee Taewook – guitar
Lee Jooyeong – bass
Slow Rabbit – vocal arrangement, recording engineer
Supreme Boi – rap arrangement, recording engineer
Hiss noise – digital editing
Jaycen Joshua – mix engineer

Charts

Korean version

Japanese version

References

2018 singles
BTS songs
2018 songs
Songs written by Bang Si-hyuk
Songs written by Pdogg
Songs written by Ali Tamposi
Songs written by RM (rapper)
Songs written by J-Hope
Songs written by Suga (rapper)
Hybe Corporation singles